was a Japanese organized crime figure.  He was the 4th head of the Kokusui-kai, a Tokyo-based yakuza gang. He was also the 7th socho of Kanamachi-ikka.

In August 2005, Kudo shocked the yakuza world when he became sworn brothers with new Yamaguchi-gumi godfather Kenichi Shinoda in a sakazuki (sake-sharing) ceremony.  As a result of the ritual, the Kokusui-kai became an affiliate of their former enemies, the Yamaguchi-gumi.

On February 15, 2007, he was found dead bleeding from an apparent self-inflicted gunshot wound. The suicide followed a rash of shootings and retaliations between Kokusui-kai and a rival gang, Sumiyoshi-kai, over gang territory, including the shooting death of Sumiyoshi-kai's boss. The shootings ended with an agreement between the Kokusui-kai and Yamaguchi-gumi to stop fighting on the 8th of February.

References

1930s births
2007 deaths
Yakuza members
Yamaguchi-gumi
Suicides by firearm in Japan